Angelo Vasta QC (8 January 1941 – 29 September 2021) was a prominent Queen's Counsel and judge of the Supreme Court of Queensland (1984 to 1989). He is the first superior court judge with an Italian background to be appointed in Queensland, and the second one to be appointed in Australia.

Biography
Angelo Vasta was born in Innisfail on 8 January 1941. He completed his education from Melbourne University in 1964. In 1967, he moved to Brisbane where Vasta was called to the Queensland bar in 1968, appointed a QC in 1980, Chief Crown prosecutor in 1981 and appointed to the Supreme Court in 1984. He maintained a successful private practice at the Queensland Bar before retiring on 1 July 2020.

On 24 October 1988, Vasta either stood down or was stood down as a Judge of the Supreme Court of Queensland after evidence of his friendship with the suspended Queensland Police Commissioner Terence Lewis was given at the Fitzgerald Inquiry into police corruption.  He was formally removed from office on 8 June 1989 by an Act of the Queensland Parliament, the only occasion since Federation
that any parliament in Australia has removed a Supreme Court judge. His removal is now considered controversial and attempts have been made to reverse the decision. The most recent effort, pioneered by Bob Katter and Robbie Katter, failed in 2017.

Vasta's son, Ross Vasta MP, has been a member of the Australian House of Representatives since 2010, and previously served from 2004 to 2007.

Since 1 January 2015, another son, Salvatore "Sal" Vasta, has been a judge of the Federal Circuit Court of Australia. Vasta's daughter-in-law, Sal's wife, is Magistrate Deborah Vasta, a Magistrate of the Magistrates Court of Queensland.

Vasta died in Brisbane, Queensland on 29 September 2021 aged 80.

See also
List of Australian judges whose security of tenure was challenged

References

1941 births
2021 deaths
Judges of the Supreme Court of Queensland
20th-century Australian judges
Australian King's Counsel
Australian people of Italian descent
Australian people of Sicilian descent
People from Innisfail, Queensland